Turkel is a surname. Notable people with the surname include:

Ann Turkel (born 1946), American actress and former model
Bruce Turkel (born 1957), creative entrepreneur, speaker, and branding expert
Eli Turkel, Israeli applied mathematician, Professor of Applied Mathematics at the School of Mathematical Sciences, Tel Aviv University
Jacob Turkel (born 1935), Israeli judge, former Supreme Court of Israel Justice
Joe Turkel (1927–2022), American character actor of film and television
Nury Turkel (born 1970), Uyghur American attorney, public official and human rights advocate

See also
Turkel Commission, an inquiry set up by Israeli Government to investigate the Gaza flotilla raid and the Blockade of Gaza
Dorothy H. Turkel House, private residence in north-central Detroit, Michigan
Turk (disambiguation)
Turkhel
Turkiella